The 1954 United States Senate election in New Jersey was held on November 2, 1954. Republican U.S Representative Clifford P. Case defeated Democratic U.S. Representative Charles R. Howell with 48.66% of the vote.

This election was decided by the fewest votes (3,507) and narrowest percentage margin (0.19%) in New Jersey history.

Republican primary

Candidates
Clifford Case, U.S. Representative from Rahway

Declined
Robert C. Hendrickson, incumbent Senator since 1949

Results
Case was unopposed for the Republican nomination.

Democratic primary

Candidates
Charles R. Howell, U.S. Representative from Pennington

Results
Howell was unopposed for the Democratic nomination.

General election

Candidates
George Breitman, Socialist Workers
Clifford P. Case, Republican
Fred A. Hartley, Jr. (write-in), former U.S. Representative
Charles R. Howell, Democratic
Henry J. Krajewski
Albert Ronis, Socialist Labor

Campaign
During the campaign, Case openly criticized Senator Joseph McCarthy, and pledged to vote against seating McCarthy on any committee with investigative functions. McCarthy's supporters called him "a pro-Communist Republicrat" and "Stalin's choice for Senator." The Star-Ledger quoted former Communist Party leader Bella Dodd as saying  that Case's sister Adelaide was "an active member of several Communist front groups." It was later revealed, however, that the Adelaide Case in question was not the candidate's sister but a college professor who had died in 1948. A conservative faction within the Republican Party unsuccessfully attempted to force Case off the ballot, also proposing a write-in campaign for former U.S. Representative Fred A. Hartley, Jr., co-author of the Taft-Hartley Act. Case was endorsed by President Eisenhower and Vice President Richard M. Nixon.

Results

References

1954
New Jersey
United States Senate